Stauropteridaceae is a family of ferns or fern-like plants from the Devonian and Upper Carboniferous.

References
 Thomas N. Taylor, Edith L. Taylor, Michael Krings: Paleobotany. The Biology and Evolution of Fossil Plants . Second Edition, Academic Press 2009, p. 405-407.

Devonian plants
Carboniferous plants
Devonian first appearances
Pennsylvanian extinctions
Prehistoric plant families
Ferns